The Powder Magazine is a gunpowder magazine and museum at 79 Cumberland Street in Charleston, South Carolina, USA.  Completed in 1713, it is the oldest surviving public building in the former Province of Carolina.  It was used as a gunpowder store through the American Revolutionary War, and later saw other uses. The Powder Magazine was declared a National Historic Landmark in 1989. It has been operated as a museum by the National Society of the Colonial Dames of America since the early 1900s.  It was designated a National Historic Landmark in 1972.

Description and history
The Charleston Powder Magazine is located in the historic center of Charleston, on the south side of Cumberland Street, between Church and Meeting Streets. Each wall of the building boasts a large arch. The walls get thinner as they reach the top of the arch, changing from three feet thick, near the ground, to just a few inches thick near the top. There are also few doors in the building, so that in the event of an explosion, most of the explosive force would exit through the roof, with the arches acting like funnels. Sand stored in the roof would then smother and put out the fire.

Construction of the building was authorized by the Province of Carolina in 1703, during Queen Anne's War, as part of a series of fortifications, but it was not completed until 1713.  It was used as a powder magazine until late in the American Revolutionary War, after which it saw a variety of other uses, including as a wine cellar for Gabriel Manigault.  The local chapter of the National Society of the Colonial Dames of America acquired the building in 1902, and now operates it as a museum, which includes historic artifacts and displays about the building during the Colonial and American Revolution periods.

See also

List of National Historic Landmarks in South Carolina
National Register of Historic Places listings in Charleston County, South Carolina

References

External links
The Powder Magazine - official museum site
Powder Magazine, Charleston County (79 Cumberland St., Charleston), at South Carolina Department of Archives and History
Historic Charleston's Religious and Community Buildings, a National Park Service Discover Our Shared Heritage Travel Itinerary

National Historic Landmarks in South Carolina
Government buildings completed in 1713
Museums in Charleston, South Carolina
Military and war museums in South Carolina
National Register of Historic Places in Charleston, South Carolina
Gunpowder magazines
Military facilities on the National Register of Historic Places in South Carolina
National Society of the Colonial Dames of America
Historic district contributing properties in South Carolina